Liceo Víctor Jara is a Chilean high school located in Peralillo, Colchagua Province, Chile. It was established in 1983.

References

Educational institutions established in 1983
Secondary schools in Chile
Schools in Colchagua Province
1983 establishments in Chile